Glory in the Highest: Christmas Songs of Worship is the first Christmas album by Chris Tomlin. It was released on October 6, 2009. It peaked at No. 1 on Billboard Holiday albums chart and No. 79 on the Billboard 200 chart. In 2010, it re-entered the Billboard 200 and peaked at No. 19. It was recorded live in the studio and features a duet with Matt Redman, as well as two tracks featuring Christy Nockels and Audrey Assad.

Track listing

Personnel 
 Chris Tomlin – lead vocals (1–8, 10, 12), acoustic guitar (1, 2, 3, 5, 6, 8, 10), acoustic piano (7), backing vocals (10, 11)
 Matt Gilder – acoustic piano (1–6, 8–12), keyboards (1, 3, 5–8, 10, 12), Hammond B3 organ (2, 5, 12), pads (6)
 Ed Cash – acoustic guitar (1, 2, 3, 5, 7, 8, 10, 12), backing vocals (1–8, 12), electric guitar (4, 6)
 Daniel Carson – electric guitar (1–8, 10, 12)
 Jesse Reeves – bass (1, 2, 3, 5–8, 10, 12)
 Chris Donahue – upright bass (4, 11)
 Travis Nunn – drums (1–8, 10, 11, 12)
 Ken Lewis – percussion (1–8, 10, 12)
 Christy Nockels – backing vocals (1–5, 7, 8, 12), lead vocals (9)
 Nickie Conley – singer (5, 12)
 Jason Eskridge – singer (5, 12)
 Nirva Ready – singer (5, 12)
 Matt Redman – lead vocals (10)
 Audrey Assad – lead vocals (11)
 Choir is made up of various friends and families.

Production 
 Ed Cash – producer, mixing, overdub recording
 Louie Giglio – executive producer
 Brad O'Donnell – executive producer
 Shane D. Wilson – engineer
 Rob Clark – assistant engineer
 Erin Kaus – assistant engineer
 Matt Armstrong – assistant engineer, overdub recording assistant 
 Bob Ludwig – mastering
 Ocean Way (Nashville, Tennessee) – recording location
 Ed's (Franklin, Tennessee) – recording location (overdubs)
 Gateway Mastering (Portland, Massachusetts) – mastering location
 Jess Chambers – A&R administration
 Gary Dorsey – original cover concept, design
 Andy Norris – additional cover design
 Jesse Owen – packaging design
 Shelley Giglio – art direction
 Leighton Ching – art direction
 Jan Cook – art direction

Awards
In 2010, the album was nominated for a Dove Award for Christmas Album of the Year at the 41st GMA Dove Awards.

Charts

Weekly charts

Year-end charts

Certifications

See also
 List of Billboard Top Holiday Albums number ones of the 2000s
 List of Billboard Top Holiday Albums number ones of the 2010s

References

2009 Christmas albums
Christmas albums by American artists
Chris Tomlin albums